Chatham House Grammar School was an all boys grammar school in Ramsgate, Kent, England, that was merged in September 2011 with its sister school Clarendon House Grammar School to become the Chatham & Clarendon Grammar School.

It had a coeducational sixth form and shared teaching facilities and various A Level courses with Clarendon House Grammar School. The two schools worked together to provide subjects, bands, and outings.  Both schools were co-ed from the sixth form (Year 12 and 13).

History
Chatham House was founded in 1797 by Dr. William Humble along Chatham Street, although there is evidence that the school had existed prior to its formal establishment. The school underwent major changes during the 1800s. The buildings were renovated and expanded, rugby and hockey were also introduced into the sporting programme.

World War II
When Ramsgate was bombed during World War II, a bomb hit the school library (where a skylight now stands) but did not detonate. Prior to that, the library had been the school chapel, as evidenced by the amount of stained glass windows situated quite high up.

The school had numerous entrances to private shelters used in the second world war to shelter from air raids. Most of these entrances were covered up (now underneath the playing fields) but the last ones are still visible on the lower playground and have been used recently by the local fire authorities for training purposes.

In a carpark of the school there is also a slabbed-over entrance to the Ramsgate A.R.P. tunnels, which ran for around 3.5 miles. These are not connected to the school shelters.

The main building of the school as well as the railings were grade II listed.

Admissions
The school had approximately 813 students including the 262 students in the sixth form, accepting only boys in years 7-11, and a limited number of girls in the sixth form, mostly drawn from the Isle of Thanet that encompasses Ramsgate, Broadstairs and Margate, but some from as far away as Herne Bay and the Whitstable area. Chatham House is situated just south of the junction of the A255 and the A254.

On 4 March 2008, the school had an Ofsted inspection which rated the school as outstanding - the highest grade achievable. All areas that were inspected were found to be Grade 1 (outstanding) or Grade 2 (good) and the school was praised for its work.

The school had the highest rate of GCSE and A level passes in Kent, 73% of students taking their GCSEs last year got A* to C.

Uniform
The school maintained a strict system of uniform throughout all years, including the sixth form.  The uniform consisted of a dark green blazer, dark trousers, white shirt and a green tie striped with the correct form the pupil was placed into.

In the senior school (years 9-13), ties were also green and striped as previously mentioned.

Some pupils also became eligible to wear ties in recognition of other achievement.  House 'colours' were similar to the house tie but with a white stripe running along each side of the coloured stripe.

School 'colours' were a single white school crest on a dark green tie with a white stripe.  There were also 'colours' for sport and music, which consist of a repeating pattern of white stripes and the school crest and were earned by representing the school's first team in 75% of the matches in a season.

House system
The school had a house system with the junior school consisting of years 7 and 8. From year 9, the pupils joined the senior houses. In total there were 8 houses, 4 junior school houses and 4 senior school houses. In the senior houses pupils wore a tie indicative of their house. In year 12 (or lower sixth) the form groups were split into two. The nomenclature for representing a pupil's house was: 7Wh, 11Pe, 12To(ii)

The ties consisted of a green tie striped with the appropriate colours named below:

The former Chatham House Junior Houses were:
Brackenbury's (Brack's)
Norman's 
White's 
Larkin's
All pupils wore dark green ties.

In the Chatham House Senior houses, pupils wore a dark green tie with a coloured stripe: 
 Heath's = white striped tie
 Mann's = orange striped tie
 Pearce's = light green striped tie
 Thomas' = pink striped tie

Former senior houses, no longer in use, were:
 Coleman's - sky blue stripes
 Searle's - red stripes
 Simmond's - purple stripes
 Thornton's = yellow striped tie

The house system was used for sporting events - house fixtures results accumulate over the academic year - and for various other competitions, including acting and design contests. The results from all of these fixtures were tallied at the end of each year to determine the winner of the Cock House Trophy.

Competition cups
Throughout the school year, the houses took part in competition cups, which contribute points toward the Cock House Cup. These included the Taylor Acting Cup, Larkin Music Cup, Chapman Design Cup and the Curzon Picture debating competition. Also, sports day events and general achievement contribute towards house points totals.

Merger
In 2009, Chatham House and the nearby girls-only Clarendon House formed the Chatham & Clarendon Grammar School Federation. The Federation became a new Converter Academy in January 2011, bringing greater control over admissions, site and buildings, curriculum development and much-needed additional income.

In Spring 2011, despite previous news letters stating "the federation is not a merger or a takeover of the girls' school", it was announced that the schools will work together as one school. Year 7, 8 and 9 pupils would be based at Chatham House and year 10 and 11 pupils would be based at the former Clarendon House.

Beginning September 2011, the new school Chatham & Clarendon Grammar School introduced a combined house system resulting from the amalgamation of old Chatham and Clarendon houses.

Notable alumni

Alumni of Chatham House are known as Old Ruymians. Chatham House has the sixth highest number of Who's Who entries for state schools.

Well known Old Ruymians include:
 Iain Aitch, author and journalist
 Herbert William Allingham, Surgeon to the Household of King Edward VII, and Surgeon in Ordinary to the Prince of Wales (later King George V)
 Rear-Adm Timothy Chittenden, submariner and Director from 2000–03 of the Warship Support Agency
 Matt Corker, professional rugby union player for the London Wasps now Captain of London Welsh
 Maj-Gen Patrick Crawford GM, Commandant from 1989–93 of the Royal Army Medical College
 Jamie Davies, racing driver
 Matt Dunn, author
 Marc Gascoigne, fantasy writer
 Geoffrey Colin Guy CMG CVO OBE, Governor of Saint Helena (1976–81), and Commissioner of the Turks and Caicos Islands (1958–59, 1959–65)

 Sir Edward Heath, Prime Minister of the United Kingdom from 1970 to 1974
 Stewart Jackson, Conservative MP for Peterborough (2005–2017)
 Sean Kerly, Olympic field hockey player
 Lieutenant Marc Lawrence, Sea King observer of 849 Naval Air Squadron, killed on 21 March 2003 in a crash in Kuwait
 Ali Marchant, radio personality & DJ
 John Marek, Labour MP for Wrexham (1983–2001)
 Desmond Misselbrook CBE, Chairman from 1972–78 of Livingston Development Corporation
 Frank Muir, humourist
 Rev Dr Edward Norman, gave the BBC Reith Lecture in 1978
 John Ovenden, Labour MP for Gravesend (1974–79); Leader of Kent County Council (1994–97)
 Geoff Parsons, Olympic high jumper
 Charles Robson (1859–1943), Middlesex and Hampshire wicket-keeper, and secretary (manager) of Southampton Football Club
 Prof Robert Tavernor, Emeritus Professor of Architecture and Urban Design at the London School of Economics (LSE)
 Air Chief Marshal Sir Peter Terry, Station Commander from 1968 to 1970 of RAF El Adem in Libya;  Governor of Gibraltar (1985–89).
 Nik Turner, founder of the space rock band Hawkwind
 Most Rev Gregory James Venables, Archbishop Primate of South America and Bishop of Argentina (2002–present)
 Air Chief Marshal Sir Bill Wratten CBE CB - Air Officer Commanding-in-Chief of RAF Strike Command during the first Gulf War, Station Commander from 1980–82 of RAF Coningsby

References

External links
 Chatham Clarendon Grammar School Federation Home Page
 Chatham House (previous website)
 OFSTED report
 EduBase

News items
 17-year-old boy electrocuted in April 2009

Defunct boys' schools in the United Kingdom
Defunct grammar schools in England
Boys' schools in Kent
Grammar schools in Kent
Ramsgate
1797 establishments in England
Educational institutions established in 1797
Grade II listed educational buildings
Grade II listed buildings in Kent
International Baccalaureate schools in England
Academies in Kent